Cornus asperifolia, called toughleaf dogwood, is species of Cornus native to the southeastern United States. A shrub or small tree typically 3 to 5m tall, it has yellowwhite flowers and white fruit.

References

asperifolia
Endemic flora of the United States
Plants described in 1803
Flora without expected TNC conservation status